Gary "Big Robbo" Robson (born 19 June 1967) is an English professional darts player who plays in World Darts Federation events.

Robson now resides in the small rural town of Rothbury, Northumberland.

Career
Robson qualified twice for the World Championships, but was beaten in the first round on each occasion. He made it for a third time in 2004, but found himself 2–0 down in sets against Steve Coote. However, Robson recovered and took the match to a sudden death deciding leg, which he won. Bobby George commented that "you won't see browner darts in this tournament than that match". Robson had another excellent performance in losing to 'Silverback' Tony O'Shea in the second round.

Robson's biggest tournament win so far was at the World Darts Trophy in Utrecht, Netherlands. He beat Mervyn King 6–4 in the 2005 final, averaging 91.5 for three darts, which was a fair way below his averages during his aforementioned performances in the 2004 World Championship.

Robson had to wait until 2007 to win another match at the World Championship, but his opponent for that match was pre-tournament favourite Michael van Gerwen. Robson won 3–2, although the teenage van Gerwen was not quite at his best form and looked nervous on some doubles. Robson did not have to wait long for his next win, as he made the quarter-finals for the first time in his career with a superb 4–3 win over former champion John Walton, having been 3–1 down. Robson could have had a nine-dart leg, but missed his seventh treble. However, his run was ended by Dutchman Niels de Ruiter. Robson led 2–0 and 4–2 but ended up losing 5–4. This match included a leg which Tony Green and John Part touted as "probably the best in thirty years", which Robson won to take the fifth set and lead 3–2.

Robson returned to the World Championship in 2008 where he was drawn against 2002 World Champion, Tony David. This was Robson's only win at the 2008 World Championship, as in the second round he came up against an in-form Darryl Fitton. Fitton averaged over 100 in a 4–0 victory.

In the 2009 World Championship, Robson reached the quarter final for the second time, beating Stephen Bunting and Martin Atkins before losing to Martin Adams. 2009 was not a good year for Robson as a whole and as a result, he was forced to qualify for the 2010 Lakeside World Championship.

Robson lost 3–0 in a first round clash with 2009 champion and 5th seed Ted Hankey at the 2010 BDO World Championship. The next year, Robson was seeded once more and cruised through to the quarter-finals for a third time by defeating Steve Douglas and Dave Chisnall for the loss of just one set. He then led Martin Phillips 3–1 but was once again defeated 5–4.

Robson was knocked out of the 2012 World Championships in the first round losing 3–0 to Steve Douglas
Gary was again knocked out in the first round in 2013 this time losing 3–1 to Garry Thompson

PDC
He competed for a tour card at the 2020 Q school in an attempt to join the Professional Darts Corporation, however he finished 164th and failed to win a tour card.

World Championship results

BDO

 2001: 1st Round (lost to Raymond van Barneveld 1–3)
 2003: 1st Round (lost to Robert Wagner 1–3)
 2004: 2nd Round (lost to Tony O'Shea 2–3)
 2005: 1st Round (lost to Darryl Fitton 1–3)
 2006: 1st Round (lost to Gary Anderson 1–3)
 2007: Quarter Finals (lost to Niels de Ruiter 4–5)
 2008: 2nd Round (lost to Darryl Fitton 0–4)
 2009: Quarter Finals (lost to Martin Adams 4–5)
 2010: 1st Round (lost to Ted Hankey 0–3)
 2011: Quarter Finals (lost to Martin Phillips 4–5)
 2012: 1st Round (lost to Steve Douglas 0–3)
 2013: 1st Round (lost to Garry Thompson 1–3)
 2014: 2nd Round (lost to Robbie Green 1–4)
 2015: 2nd Round (lost to Jeff Smith 3–4)
 2016: 1st Round (lost to Madars Razma 1–3)
 2018: 1st Round (lost to Glen Durrant 0–3)
 2019: 1st Round (lost to David Cameron 1–3)
 2020: 1st Round (lost to Ben Hazel 2–3)

Career finals

BDO major finals: 2 (1 title, 1 runner-up)

Performance timeline

Notes

External links
Official website for Gary Robson
Gary Robson's profile and stats on Darts Database
2006 Lakeside World Championship programme profile

1967 births
Living people
People from Cramlington
Sportspeople from Northumberland
English darts players
British Darts Organisation players